Legit.ng (formerly Naij.com) is a Nigerian digital media and news platform.

It is ranked as the #1 news and entertainment platform and the 7th overall most visited website in Nigeria by Alexa Internet. Legit.ng is the biggest publisher on Facebook by the audience in ‘Media’ category.

History 
Founded in 2012, Legit.ng has its headquarters in Ikeja, Lagos, Nigeria and launched an editorial hub in the country’s capital, Abuja, in May 2015. Legit.ng is partner of Genesis Media global consumer Internet company which also cooperates with Tuko (in Kenya) and Yen (in Ghana).

In May 2014, Legit.ng released an Android mobile app. It soon became #1 in its category in Nigeria and was featured by Google Play Market. The app hit 500,000 installs in 10 months. The all-time number of installs is now getting close to 5M. 

In June 2015, Legit.ng partnered with browser software makers Opera Software and telecoms giant MTN Group to bring "one million days of free Internet to Nigeria".

The website's servers were attacked by hackers in July 2015.

In August 2015, a news section in the Hausa language was launched.

In February 2016, Legit.ng was among the first in Nigeria to roll out Facebook’s instant articles. In 2017, Facebook did a case study of this launch with Legit.ng and published the story in the Facebook Audience Network.

In March 2017, Legit.ng started a local journalism project to connect the reporters representing all the 36 states and the FCT. In the same period, a missing person initiative was launched, which in future helped Nigerians find their loved ones and return them home.

In October 2018, Naij.com changed its name to Legit.ng.

In February 2019, Legit.ng was among 87 media organizations selected across 28 countries to receive Google News Initiative funds.

In July 2019, Legit.ng received an award for the most people-friendly online platform for election coverage during the 2019 polls. The recognition was held at the Suncity Champion of Democracy and Development Awards held in Abuja.

A new desk, human interest, was launched to tell more stories about outstanding Nigerians both at home and in the diaspora in February 2020.

In October 2020, Legit.ng organized Big Naija Independence prominent student contest to celebrate Nigeria's 60th Independence. The Big Naija Independence contest was aimed at spotting young talented students passionate about journalism and writing.

Popularity 
As of July 2015, it has more than 13 million monthly readers and is ranked as the 7th overall most visited website in Nigeria and the first among publishers by Alexa. Currently the website's Facebook community has over 4.3 million members.  Legit.ng is the biggest publisher on Facebook by the audience in ‘Media’ category.

In October 2018 the number of Legit TV YouTube channel subscribers exceeded 100,000 and the page got verified by the network. It has been ranked among the top 50 YouTube channels in Nigeria by vidooly.com.

Contributors 
Bloggers and columnists include Japheth J. Omojuwa, Tolu Ogunlesi, and Ogunlowo Joseph. Legit.ng also generates content based on user-submitted stories.

References

External links 

Nigerian news websites
Internet properties established in 2012
Nigerian companies established in 2012
Companies based in Lagos